

Erwin Jaenecke (22 April 1890 – 3 July 1960), was a general in the Wehrmacht of Nazi Germany during World War II who commanded the 17th Army.

Jaenecke served on the Eastern Front as commander of the 389th Infantry Division and later the IV Army Corps. He was wounded at the Battle of Stalingrad and flown out as one of the last higher officers.

In April 1943 he commanded the LXXXII Army Corps, and from 25 June the 17th Army in the Caucasus and later the Crimean Peninsula. In a 29 April 1944 meeting with Adolf Hitler in Berchtesgaden, Jaenecke insisted that Sevastopol should be evacuated. He was relieved of his command afterward.

Later, he was held responsible for the loss of Crimea, arrested in Romania and court-martialed. Heinz Guderian was appointed as a special investigator in the case. Guderian proceeded slowly and eventually Jaenecke was quietly acquitted in June 1944. Jaenecke was dismissed from the army on 31 January 1945. On 15 June 1945 he was arrested by the Soviet authorities and sentenced to 25 years of hard labor for war crimes committed under his army command in 1942. He was released in 1955.

Awards 

 Knight's Cross of the Iron Cross on 9 October 1942

References

Citations

Bibliography

 

1890 births
1960 deaths
German Army generals of World War II
Colonel generals of the German Army (Wehrmacht)
German Army personnel of World War I
Recipients of the Knight's Cross of the Iron Cross
Recipients of the Gold German Cross
German prisoners of war in World War II held by the Soviet Union
Military personnel from Lower Saxony
Recipients of the Order of Michael the Brave, 2nd class
German military personnel of the Spanish Civil War
People from Emsland
Nazis convicted of war crimes